Shur Gol (also Romanized as Shūr Gol) is a village in Qeshlaq-e Jonubi Rural District of Qeshlaq Dasht District, Bileh Savar County, Ardabil province, Iran. At the 2006 census, its population was 650 in 126 households. The following census in 2011 counted 641 people in 151 households. The latest census in 2016 showed a population of 405 people in 107 households; it was the largest village in its rural district.

References 

Bileh Savar County

Populated places in Ardabil Province

Populated places in Bileh Savar County

Towns and villages in Bileh Savar County